The Cordova Theater in Pullman, Washington is a Mission/Spanish Revival style theater that was designed by architects Whitehouse & Price and interior decorator Carl R. Berg.  It was constructed in 1927.  "In 1950 an "Art Deco-style marquee with neon lighting" was added.

It was listed on the National Register of Historic Places in 2004, at which time it had run movies for "76 years and [was] the oldest and longest-running movie house in Pullman".

References

Mission Revival architecture in Washington (state)
Theatres completed in 1927
Buildings and structures in Pullman, Washington
Theatres on the National Register of Historic Places in Washington (state)
National Register of Historic Places in Whitman County, Washington